Daniel Arenas Consuegra (born March 30, 1979) is a Colombian actor who has worked in both Colombia and Mexican television.

Early life
Arenas was born on March 30, 1979 in Bucaramanga, Santander, Colombia. He is the youngest of six children. He studied acting in the United States.

Career

Arenas's television debut was in Francisco el Matemático. In 2005, he participated in the telenovela Los Reyes, playing Santiago Iriarte, a performance that earned him a nomination for the India Catalina Awards in the category of Best Actor. In 2008, he participated in the telenovela La sucursal del cielo, playing Samuel Lizcano, a pilot of the Air Force.

Arenas's debut in Televisa was in Teresa, marking his first telenovela in Mexico. He has also worked in Amorcito Corazón, produced by Lucero Suárez, with Elizabeth Álvarez, Diego Olivera and Africa Zavala. In 2012, Arenas made his debut in theater, with "Hercules the Musical", where he played Hercules, the hero of Greek mythology, alongside Violeta Isfel and Miguel Pizarro. In 2013, he starred as protagonist in the telenovela Corazón Indomable, a remake of Marimar, produced by Nathalie Lartilleux, where he worked with Ana Brenda Contreras.

Arenas once again worked with Nathalie Lartilleux in the 2014 telenovela La Gata with Maite Perroni, Erika Buenfil, and Laura Zapata.

Arenas served as a judge in the 10th season of Nuestra Belleza Latina.

Filmography

Awards and nominations

Premios TVyNovelas

People en Español

Premios Juventud

Premios India Catalina

Personal life
As of 2021, Arenas is dating former Miss Colombia Daniella Álvarez.

References

External links
.
 Biography of Daniel Arenas 

Colombian expatriates in Mexico
Colombian expatriates in the United States
Colombian male television actors
Colombian male telenovela actors
Colombian male film actors
1979 births
Living people
People from Bucaramanga